Alta Loma (Spanish for "Tall Hill") is one of three unincorporated areas that became part of the city of Rancho Cucamonga, California, United States in 1977. Its ZIP codes are 91701 and 91737. The name comes from the Spanish words for "high hill." Alta Loma had previously been known as "Iamosa".

Overview
Alta Loma is an affluent area in San Bernardino County. It is almost completely residential and, by city ordinance, no commercial business may exist above 19th Street, with the exception of several businesses already in place when the ordinance was enacted (such as the intersection of Lemon Avenue and Haven Avenue).  In addition, homes north of Banyan Street must have a minimum of 1/2 acre lots, with the exception of the development known as "Compass Rose Phase II", directly west of Chaffey College (between Banyan Street and Wilson Avenue).

The three communities incorporated after years of debate and at least one failed attempt on the ballot.  Residents of Alta Loma and Etiwanda finally agreed to incorporation provided their identifying community names would be kept along with separate post offices and ZIP codes. In addition, businesses are permitted to use either Alta Loma or Rancho Cucamonga on letterheads, business permits, and other records.

Alta Loma (and much of the rest of Cucamonga) was formerly home to old citrus groves and grape vineyards.  The reason many homes above Banyan Street, in particular, have orange and lemon trees on their property may be attributed to this; many horse trails are lined with eucalyptus trees, which are former windbreaks for the groves. Even among the office buildings and shopping malls that have been built in recent decades, the occasional patch of greenfield has a few rows of grapevines.

History

Grand Prix Fire

Rancho Cucamonga, Alta Loma and Etiwanda were most affected by the October 2003 Grand Prix fire, which combined with the Old Fire.
The Grand Prix fire, which began October 21, 2003, ripped across the mountains just above and, in some places, down into Alta Loma and Etiwanda for six days.  Overgrown brush fueled fire, which ran across the mountain tops and higher foothills to eventually fly into the canyons that are surrounded by homes. It destroyed 13 homes (including 2 mobile homes) and five outbuildings, and damaged 9 others in Alta Loma.

Geography

Most of the homes in the foothills of Alta Loma and Etiwanda sit on alluvial fans punctuated by deep debris canyons.  Some of these canyons are used for water collection and thus the area does not typically take water from the Colorado River.

Cucamonga Canyon in particular is a favorite among hikers, although dangerous due to the rough terrain, loose rocks, possible flooding, poison oak, bears, mountain lions, rattlesnakes, bobcats, and other wildlife.  Far up the canyon are the Cucamonga Falls, which have occasionally caused contention between the city council, residents, and developers, due to developers wanting to build homes over the falls.

The Alta Loma area experiences high winds known in the Inland Empire and the rest of Southern California as the "Santa Ana winds." Heavy rain storms in the past created the need for  concrete flood control channels to prevent severe flooding.

Alta Loma rests on the Cucamonga-Sierra Madre Fault.  It is a thrust fault, meaning the sides of the fault push toward each other.  Several other faults pass through the area, too, including the San Andreas Fault system, of which most of the area's faults are a part.

Notable people
 Carlos Bocanegra, former captain of the U.S. Men's National Soccer Team.
 George Chaffey
 William Chaffey
 Peter A. Demens
 Sam Maloof, world-renowned woodworker, lived in Alta Loma.  His work is featured in museums around the United States, including the Smithsonian Institution.  His home is a State of California historical landmark. During the construction of the 210 freeway, Maloof's home was moved from the 210 freeway corridor to the top of Carnelian street, where the home is now a museum.  The official buildings for the Inland Empire's Sam and Alfreda Maloof Foundation for Arts and Crafts are currently being built on the property.
 Erik Emerson Shilling, one of the "Flying Tigers" pilots with the American Volunteer Group (AVG) who fought the Japanese in the skies over China and Burma only days before the United States entered World War II. Mr Shilling was awarded two Presidential Unit Citations, the Distinguished Flying Cross with Oak Leaf Cluster, Air Medal with Clusters, World War II Victory Ribbon, and the Chinese Cloud Banner. Mr. Shilling is also the author of "Destiny: A Flying Tiger's Rendezvous With Fate".
 Eric Weddle, current free safety for the Los Angeles Rams.

Landmarks

Historical landmarks
 Demens-Tolstoy house (c.1890) – 9686 Hillside Road (at NW corner with Archibald Avenue);– built and owned by Peter Demens, a Tolstoy family relative. Until 2005, when developers built new homes there, it was surrounded by some of the last few groves of eucalyptus, lemon, and orange trees remaining in the area. Although other families have lived there, they are required to keep the grounds and house in good condition.
 Sam Maloof Historic Residence and Woodworking Studio – 5131 Carnelian Street (at the northeast corner of the intersection with Hidden Farm Road) – historic residence of American woodworker Sam Maloof and now a museum and gardens as well as the office of the Sam and Alfreda Maloof Foundation for Arts and Crafts.
 Henry Albert building / old Alta Loma post office (c. 1906) – 7136 Amethyst Street (at the northwest corner of the intersection with Lomita Drive) – now home to Dr. Strange Records.

Structures and monuments

Native American ruins
 Like much of the area of the eastern San Gabriel range, Alta Loma's foothills contain artifacts left by the original Native Americans.  Some of these were burned and partially destroyed by the Grand Prix Fire in 2003.

Schools

Higher education
 Chaffey College – A junior college, serving over 18,000 students in the Inland Empire.

High schools
Alta Loma High School
Etiwanda High School
Rancho Cucamonga High School
Los Osos High School

Junior high schools
Vineyard Junior High
Alta Loma Junior High School has won the Presidential Physical Fitness testing nine years in a row.
Alta Loma Christian School (private)
Summit Intermediate School
Etiwanda Intermediate School
Day Creek Intermediate School
Cucamonga Middle School
Rancho Cucamonga Middle School
Ruth Musser Middle School

Elementary schools
Alta Loma
Banyan
Carnelian
Deer Canyon
Floyd M. Stork
Hermosa
Jasper
Victoria Groves
Alta Loma Christian School (private)
Terra Vista Elementary School
Coyote Canyon Elementary School
Cucamonga Elementary School
Bear Gulch Elementary School
Banyan Elementary School
Valle Vista Elementary School
Dona Merced Elementary School
Central Elementary School
Etiwanda Colony Elementary School
John L. Golden Elementary School
Grapeland Elementary School
Perdew Elementary School
Windrows Elementary School
Carlton P. Lightfoot Elementary School
Caryn Elementary School

References

 Allen, Robert V. “Peter Demens: the redoubtable hustler.” Quarterly Journal of the Library of Congress 34 (July 1977): 208-26.
 Beattie, George William and Beattie, Helen Pruitt. Heritage of the valley: San Bernardino’s first century. Pasadena: San Pasqual Press, 1939; Biobooks, 1951.
 Black, Esther Boulton. “Early descriptions of Cucamonga and Chino.” Pomona Valley Historian 13 (Winter 1979): 33-6.
 Black, Esther Boulton. “Ranch life in San Antonio Canyon in the 1870s.” Pomona Valley Historian 11 (Spring 1975): 47-58.
 Boyd, James and Brown, John Jr. History of San Bernardino and Riverside counties. 3 volumes. Chicago: Lewis Publishing Co., 1922.
 Clucas, Donald L. “Cucamonga’s ‘lost’ colonies.” Pomona Valley Historian 11 (Summer 1975): 129-38.
 Clucas, Donald L. Light over the mountain: a history of the Cucamonga area. 1974.
 Clucas, Donald L. Light over the mountain: a history of the Rancho Cucamonga area. Revised edition. Upland: California Family House, 1979.
 Conley, Bernice Bedford. Pages from the past. [Ontario?]: [1982].
 Etiwanda Centennial Committee. Etiwanda: [the first] one hundred years. Etiwanda: Etiwanda Centennial Committee, 1982.
 Hickcox, Robert L. A history of Etiwanda. 1981.

 Hofer, James D. Cucamonga wines and vines: a history of the Cucamonga Pioneer Vineyard Association. Master’s thesis, Claremont Graduate School, 1983.
 Ingersoll, Luther A. Century Annals of San Bernardino County: 1769 to 1904. Los Angeles: L. A. Ingersoll, 1904.
 Lovitt, Leah J. “The early history of Alta Loma.” Pomona Valley Historian 8 (April 1972): 63-88.
 Martz, Patricia. Description and evaluation of the cultural resources within Cucamonga. . .creek channels. UCARV No. 165. Riverside: Archeological Research Unit, University of California, 1976.
 McCrea, Janet M. History of Chaffey College. B. A. Thesis: California State Polytechnic University, 1971.
 Richards, Betty. “The Chaffeys: saga of a southern California family. Part I.” Pomona Valley Historian 7 (January 1971): 25-46.

 Sidler, W. A. Floods of the past: an assemblage of documentary observations with particular reference to the San Bernardino Valley and environs. San Bernardino Flood Control District, 1957; enlarged 1972.
 Stoebe, Martha Gaines. The history of Alta Loma, California, 1880-1980. [Rancho Cucamonga]: B and S Publishing Co., 1981.

External links
LAtimes.com, Los Angeles Times article on Rancho Cucamonga 
 Rancho-Cucamonga.ca.us (pdf), Official City of Rancho Cucamonga timeline, October 2003 Grand Prix Fire 
 Home.att.net, Personal webpage on Inland Empire history with local maps and bibliographies
 Ranco-Cucamonga.ca.us, Official City of Rancho Cucamonga historical landmarks bike tour

Neighborhoods in Rancho Cucamonga, California